Wilson Valley is a rural locality in the North Burnett Region, Queensland, Australia.

History 
Wilson Valley Provisional School opened on 4 October 1916. On 1 October 1918 it became Wilson Valley State School. It closed in 1944.

References 

North Burnett Region
Localities in Queensland